Moleiro literally meaning "miller" is an occupational surname of Portuguese or Galician language origin.

The surname may refer to:

Manuel Moleiro
Moisés Moleiro (1904–1979), Venezuelan pianist and composer

See also
José Morales Berriguete (1915–1999), Spanish footballer known as "Moleiro"

Portuguese-language surnames